"Confessions Of An Effigy" is the first single released by hard rock band Liberty Lies. It was released on 1 August 2011 under no record label. There was only a limited amount of hard copies made but the single is still available on iTunes and Spotify. These were the first recordings of Liberty Lies with the current line up.

Information
Confessions Of An Effigy was recorded at Matt O'Grady's studio in Woking. It was Liberty Lies' first recording with the new line up. 200 copies of the single were made, these are limited edition copies of the CD and are numbered, digital downloads are still available. The single shows how the new line up has changed the sound, but still a Liberty Lies sound. Lain wrote:

Track listing

Personnel
 Shaun Richards - Lead Vocals
 Josh Pritchett - Guitar
 Adam Stevens - Drums, Backing Vocals
 Matt Nickless - Guitar, Backing Vocals
 Adam Howell - Bass

References

2011 singles
2011 songs